Princess Hilda Charlotte Wilhelmine of Nassau (5 November 1864 – 8 February 1952) was Grand Duchess of Baden from 28 September 1907 to 22 November 1918 as the consort of Grand Duke Frederick II. Hilda and Frederick were the last grand ducal couple of Baden before the German Revolution of 1918.

Early life 
She was the daughter of Adolphe, Grand Duke of Luxembourg, who was Duke of Nassau until he was deposed in 1866 and his second wife Princess Adelheid-Marie of Anhalt-Dessau.

Biography 
Hilda married Frederick II, Grand Duke of Baden on 20 September 1885 at Schloss Hohenburg. The marriage did not produce surviving children. The couple became Grand Duke and Grand Duchess in 1907. Hilda was described as intelligent and interested in art, and was often present at art-exhibitions and museums. Several schools and streets, such as the schools Hilda-Gymnasium in Pforzheim, Hilda-Gymnasium in Koblenz, and the streets north- and south Hilda Promenade in Karlsruhe are named after her.

Frederick and Hilda were deposed as Grand Duke and Grand Duchess of Baden, in 1918 when all German monarchies were overthrown. At the time of the revolution, her sister-in-law, Queen Victoria of Sweden, was visiting the family. After the abdication of the German emperor, riots spread in Karlsruhe on 11 November. The son of a courtier led a group of soldiers up to the front of the palace, followed by a great crowd of people, where a few shots were fired. Hilda, as well as the rest of the family, left the palace the back way and left for the Zwingenberg palace in the Neckar valley. By permission of the new government, they were allowed to stay at the Langenstein Palace, which belonged to a Swedish count, Douglas.  The government gave the order that the former grand ducal family was to be protected, and that Langenstein be excepted from housing the returning soldiers, because the Queen of Sweden was in their company, and Baden should not do anything to offend Sweden. In 1919, the family requested permission from the government to reside in Mainau, and was told that they were now private citizens and could do as they wished.
Hilda is described as a jolly and cheerful character with the ability to ease things up with her good sense of humor, an ability she used during the revolution and the years after, taking care of her husband whose health was weak.

As Frederick and Hilda were without own direct heirs, they bequeathed their castle of Mainau to Frederick's only sister's grandson, Count Lennart Bernadotte, who was also a great-grandson of Hilda's aunt.

Honours
 :
 Dame of the Order of Louise, 1st Division
 Red Cross Medal, 1st Class
 : Dame of Honour of the Order of Theresa
 :
 Friedrich-Luise Medal
 Jubilee Medal for 1902
 Commemorative Medal for the Golden Jubilee of Grand Duke Friedrich I and Grand Duchess Luise

Ancestry

References

House of Nassau-Weilburg
1864 births
1952 deaths
Princesses of Nassau-Weilburg
House of Zähringen
People from Wiesbaden
Grand Duchesses of Baden
Hereditary Princesses of Baden
Daughters of monarchs